Agriocnemis zerafica is a species of damselfly in the family Coenagrionidae. It is native to Africa, where it is widespread across the central and western nations of the continent. It is known by the common name Sahel wisp.

This species occurs in swamps and pools in dry regions. There are no major threats but it may be affected by pollution and habitat loss to agriculture and development.

References

Coenagrionidae
Odonata of Africa
Insects described in 1915
Taxonomy articles created by Polbot